João Crisóstomo de Amorim Pessoa (14 October 1810 – 22 December 1888) was a Portuguese bishop. He was Bishop of Santiago de Cabo Verde and archbishop of Goa and Braga.

Biography
Pessoa was born on 14 October 1810 in Cantanhede in the district of Coimbra, he was taught in 1827.

Pessoa was a teacher in theology at the University of Coimbra in 1850.  He was professor in ecclesiastical sciences at the seminary in Coimbra and a substitute teacher at the Faculty of Theology in 1865.

In 1860, Pessoa became Bishop of Santiago de Cabo Verde which was ordained on 26 August, less than a year he left, by cardinal Manuel Bento Rodrigues da Silva.  Less than a year after, he became Archbishop of Goa which was confirmed in 1861 and became in 1862.  He made his entry into the city of Janeiro in 1862.  At the Rachol Seminary, he founded a rich library.

The governor José Guedes de Carvalho e Meneses conceded in 1868 for authorization for returning the metropolis.

In 1877, Pessoa returned to Portugal and became archbishop of Braga.  He disliked the diocese circumscription in 1882, which reduced the area of the diocese of Braga when parts were joined with Porto. He resigned in June 1883 and he retired to São João Baptista de Cabanas in the parish (now subdivision) of Dume in Braga.  His tomb is at Misericórdia church in Cantahede.

References

External links
D. João Crisóstomo de Amorim Pessoa at Cantanhede Municipal Library 

1810 births
1888 deaths
19th-century Roman Catholic archbishops in Portugal
Bishops of Braga
People from Cantanhede, Portugal
19th-century Roman Catholic archbishops in India
Roman Catholic bishops of Santiago de Cabo Verde
Colonial Goa
Roman Catholic archbishops of Braga